The California Clásico is the name given to the soccer rivalry between the LA Galaxy and the San Jose Earthquakes. This Major League Soccer rivalry reached its zenith from 2001 to 2005, during which time the Earthquakes and the Galaxy combined to win four MLS Cup titles. The term "Clasico" is commonly used to refer to other rivalries in Spanish-speaking countries, most prominently, the Spanish Clásico between Barcelona and Real Madrid, or the Argentine Superclásico between Boca Juniors and River Plate.

Los Angeles and San Jose is considered to be one of the most historical rivalries in American soccer. The British daily newspaper The Guardian rates "the California Clasico is perhaps the most historic and intense rivalry the league has." Todd Dunivant, the retired U.S. national team and MLS player, when asked about the rivalry stated "I think it's the best rivalry in MLS, I think it's got the most history, it's got the most meaningful big games".

History

1996–2005

Unified as one single state, Northern California and Southern California share a notorious rivalry. Historically, rivalries have manifested prominently in the state's professional sports including MLB, NBA, NFL and NHL. For some fans, it is traditional to hate teams from Northern or Southern California.

Both clubs were charter members of Major League Soccer in its inaugural season, with the San Jose Clash hosting the very first MLS game, shortly before their first home Clásico against the Los Angeles Galaxy in a match that drew 31,728 fans to Spartan Stadium, setting the record for attendance at a sporting event in the city of San Jose. The Clash became the Earthquakes on October 27, 1999, in readiness for the 2000 season. In 2001, both teams reached the MLS Cup 2001, with San Jose posting a 2–1 overtime victory on goals by Landon Donovan and Dwayne DeRosario. While next season, Carlos Ruiz led Los Angeles to its first MLS Cup title over the New England Revolution after San Jose was previously upset in the playoffs by the Columbus Crew. While there have been several players to play for both teams beforehand, the rivalry intensified after the Anschutz Entertainment Group (owner of the Los Angeles Galaxy) took sole ownership of the San Jose Earthquakes in December 2002.

The two teams squared off again in the first round of the 2003 MLS Cup playoffs in what would become an epic series. Los Angeles won the first game at home 2–0 in the two-game aggregate-goal series. In the second game in San Jose, the Galaxy scored two early goals to widen its aggregate lead to four goals, only to have San Jose score five unanswered goals to win the series 5–4. Many neutral MLS pundits at the time viewed that game as the best in league history. After eliminating the Galaxy, San Jose went on to defeat the Kansas City Wizards en route to winning its second MLS Cup title (over the Chicago Fire) in three years.

After a rumored buyout of the Quakes by Mexican soccer side Club América in January 2004, Earthquakes general manager Johnny Moore resigned prior to the 2004 season and was replaced by former U.S. and Galaxy defender Alexi Lalas. Under Lalas, 2004 ended up being a down year for the Quakes as it barely made the playoffs on the final day of the regular season. Both San Jose and Los Angeles were eliminated from the playoffs by Kansas City. Afterward, when Earthquakes star player Landon Donovan briefly returned to German club Bayer 04 Leverkusen after his loan agreement with San Jose expired, Lalas traded away his return rights, after which Donovan returned to play for the Galaxy. Many Earthquake fans felt betrayed and welcomed Donovan with a hostile reception when Galaxy would play at Spartan Stadium, he would be often referred to as the "American Luís Figo" as to when Figo made a hugely controversial move from Barcelona to bitter rivals Real Madrid. Several San Jose fans altered their Donovan jerseys name on the back to read "Donowho". They also brought signs with explicit messages like "Landon Judas Donovan", "PrimaDonovan Traitor" and "Donovan Is Traitor Scum."

Following the departure of Lalas to become the general manager of the MetroStars early in 2005, San Jose returned to form and captured the MLS Supporters' Shield, awarded to the league's best team during the regular season.  The two clubs met again in the playoffs, with Los Angeles finally winning a playoff series against San Jose thanks largely to the play of Donovan on its way to defeating New England in MLS Cup 2005.

On hiatus
The Earthquakes took a two-year hiatus from the league in 2006 and 2007 due to stadium and ownership issues. During that period, the Quakes' players and head coach were relocated to Houston, where they won two additional MLS Cup titles as the Houston Dynamo. Meanwhile, shortly after Lalas' brief stint with the MetroStars, he moved on to become the general manager of the Galaxy, who failed to make the playoffs during both years of San Jose's hiatus from the league.

2008–present

The San Jose Earthquakes franchise was revived by Lewis Wolff and Earthquakes Soccer, LLC, restarting the rivalry in 2008. Ignominiously, both the Quakes and Galaxy tied for the worst record that season. The Quakes lost the series and thus received the dubious distinction.

On June 25, 2011, Josh Saunders came in for injured goalie Donovan Ricketts. Saunders received a red card for what appeared to be an intentional elbow to the face of Steven Lenhart. Galaxy had no more substitute goalies and were forced to use forward Mike Magee as a last resort. Magee kept a shutout as the game ended 0-0.

The rivalry further intensified in 2012 when the Galaxy hosted the Earthquakes at The Home Depot Center with Galaxy taking the lead 2–0 but with 15 minutes left the Earthquakes came back and won the game 3–2. In late June, the Earthquakes played the Galaxy in front of 50,391 spectators at Stanford Stadium marking an attendance record for the Earthquakes franchise. Once again the Galaxy took the lead 3–2 at half time but the Earthquakes managed to score two goals to defeat the Galaxy 4–3, David Beckham was involved in scuffles during and after the match, he was awarded a one-match ban by the MLS Disciplinary Committee. The match itself was credited as one of the best MLS games in history. Galaxy's Omar Gonzalez expressed that the Earthquakes were "embarrassing", "obnoxious" and "a bunch of jokes" after a 2-2 draw.

The two teams met again in the Western Conference Semi-finals. San Jose defeated Los Angeles 1–0 in the first leg but the Galaxy came back and defeated the Earthquakes 3–1 at Buck Shaw Stadium, (3–2 on aggregate). It was the Earthquakes only loss at Buck Shaw all season.

In June 2013, the Clasico returned to Stanford Stadium and in stunning comeback fashion, the Earthquakes defeated the Galaxy with two goals by Shea Salinas and Alan Gordon in stoppage time (92',93') to win the game 3–2. San Jose became the first MLS team ever to win a game in extra time with 10 men after Víctor Bernárdez was red carded in the 77' minute.

For the first time, the California Clasico was hosted in Fresno, California, as part of the inaugural Central California Cup on February 15, 2014. The preseason exhibition match marked the first time two MLS franchises played each other in the city of Fresno.

In June 2015, the Earthquakes hosted the Galaxy at Stanford in front of 50,422 spectators. The June 2016 match set a new attendance record of 50,816.

The first Clasico of 2017 took place during preseason, at Cashman Field in Las Vegas on February 11, and San Jose won after Olmes García, acquired by San Jose in the Waiver Draft but released later on during preseason, scored in the 89th minute. The Earthquakes lost the first regular season Clasico of 2017 at home by a score of 4-2. During this match, new Earthquake Danny Hoesen scored his first goal for the club, Giovani dos Santos scored a penalty after a foul in the box by Kofi Sarkodie, and Víctor Bernárdez scored an own goal to give Los Angeles the 3-2 lead just before halftime. The two teams met again a month later at Stanford on July 1 in front of a crowd of 50,617. Jelle van Damme opened the scoring for LA in the 11th minute off of a corner kick set piece, and LA remained in the lead until the 75th minute, when San Jose goalkeeper David Bingham earned an assist on Chris Wondolowski's equalizer. Shea Salinas scored the winner in the third minute of stoppage time, bringing his total of stoppage time Clasico winners up to two, and he received a yellow card for taking off his shirt in celebration as a tribute to former teammate and fellow stoppage time hero Alan Gordon. The third official Clasico was fought just a week later on July 10, when San Jose and Los Angeles met again at Avaya Stadium, this time in the quarterfinals of the U.S. Open Cup. LA captain van Damme once again opened the scoring off of a corner kick, and once again San Jose came back to win, this time 3-2, on a Chris Wondolowski brace assisted entirely by Tommy Thompson and Hoesen's winner scored on a counter launched by Jahmir Hyka, with LA's second tally coming after an own goal that deflected off the back of San Jose keeper Andrew Tarbell. San Jose advanced to the semifinals of the tournament for the first time since 2004 and only the second time in franchise history. This match also saw Wondolowski tie Ronald Cerritos for the team's top goalscorer in the Open Cup.

Supporter groups
Although historically there have been rivalries between Northern California and Southern California supporters, a bitter rivalry exists between the San Jose Ultras and the Angel City Brigade, who support Los Angeles. Supporters from both teams taunt each other with elaborate tifo displays and chants due to the passion and hate there is. Heightened security is used to ensure no violence between the opposing groups. Social networking sites such as Facebook have also been used to jeer rival fans ensuring the rivalry continues outside of soccer.

Incidents
On October 21, 2012 during a regular season game at Buck Shaw Stadium, several LA Galaxy fans were arrested after violent altercations erupted in the stands and smoke bombs were set off during half time. In fear of causing a riot, Santa Clara and Sunnyvale police officers, some dressed in riot uniforms, arrived and cleared the Galaxy supporters section during the game.

Crossing the divide

Player transfers
While the transfer of Landon Donovan from San Jose to Los Angeles caused an uproar amongst the fans, the rivalry between the two teams has not prevented players from switching teams.

 Curt Onalfo – with Galaxy: 1996; with San Jose: 1997
 David Kramer – with Galaxy: 1996–1997; with San Jose: 1997–1999
 Harut Karapetyan – with Galaxy: 1996–1998; with San Jose: 1998, 2000
 Dan Calichman – with Galaxy: 1996–1998; with San Jose: 2000
 Eddie Lewis – with San Jose: 1996–1999; with Galaxy: 2008–2010
 Lawrence Lozzano – with San Jose: 1997–1998; with Galaxy: 1998–1999
 Gabe Eastman – with Galaxy: 1999; with San Jose: 2000
 Adam Frye – with San Jose: 1999; with Galaxy: 2000–2002
 Zak Ibsen – with Galaxy: 1999–2000; with San Jose: 2001–2002
 Joe Cannon – with San Jose: 1999–2002, 2008–2010; with Galaxy: 2007
 Simon Elliott – with Galaxy: 1999–2003; with San Jose: 2009
 Danny Califf – with Galaxy: 2000–2004; with San Jose: 2005
 Ian Russell – with San Jose: 2000–2005; with Galaxy: 2007
 Brian Ching – with Galaxy: 2001; with San Jose: 2003–2005
 Brian Mullan – with Galaxy: 2001–2002; with San Jose: 2003–2005
 Craig Waibel – with Galaxy: 2001–2002; with San Jose: 2003–2005
 Landon Donovan – with San Jose: 2001–2004; with Galaxy: 2005–2014, 2016
 Gavin Glinton – with Galaxy: 2002–2003, 2006–2007; with San Jose: 2008
 Alejandro Moreno – with Galaxy: 2002–2004; with San Jose: 2005
 Todd Dunivant – with San Jose: 2003–2004; with Galaxy: 2005–2006, 2009–2015
 Chris Aloisi – with Galaxy: 2004; with San Jose: 2005
 Jovan Kirovski – with Galaxy: 2004–2005, 2009–2011; with San Jose: 2008
 Ned Grabavoy – with Galaxy: 2004–2006; with San Jose: 2008
 Alan Gordon – with Galaxy: 2004–2010, 2014–2016; with San Jose: 2011–2014
 Kelly Gray – with San Jose: 2005, 2008–2009; with Galaxy: 2007
 Cornell Glen – with Galaxy: 2006; with San Jose: 2009–2010
 Ty Harden – with Galaxy: 2007; with San Jose: 2013–2015
 Brandon McDonald – with Galaxy: 2008; with San Jose: 2009–2011
 Dan Gargan – with San Jose: 2013; with Galaxy: 2014–2015
 David Bingham – with San Jose: 2011–2017; with Galaxy: 2018–2020

Staff

 Lothar Osiander – managed Galaxy 1996–1997; managed San Jose 1999–2000
 Frank Yallop – managed San Jose 2001–2003, 2008–2013; managed Galaxy 2006–2007
 Dominic Kinnear – coached San Jose 2001–2003, managed San Jose 2004–2005, 2014–2017; coached Galaxy 2017–present, interim manager at Galaxy 2018

Record

Games
Including penalty kick wins from 1996 to 1999 seasons

Trophies

Results

MLS regular season

MLS Cup playoffs

U.S. Open Cup

Winners
Each season, a cup is awarded to the team that won the most points in the California Clasico during the regular season. Between 1996 and 1999, matches ending in draws were culminated in a penalty shootout with the winner of the shootout gaining one point while the losing team left with no points. This system was abolished starting with the 2000 season; a draw awarded each team 1 point.

Popular culture
On October 13, 2013, the California Clasico was highlighted on the TV series, MLS Insider, explaining the history of the rivalry from the different perspectives of players such as Chris Wondolowski and Landon Donovan.

See also
Northern California – Southern California rivalry
Dodgers–Giants rivalry
49ers–Rams rivalry
Kings–Sharks rivalry

Notes

References

External links
 The 2005 California Clasico semifinal playoff series

LA Galaxy
San Jose Earthquakes
Major League Soccer rivalries
Soccer in California
1996 establishments in California
Nicknamed sporting events